The A244-s is an Italian lightweight, fire-and-forget torpedo employed for anti-submarine warfare. It can be launched from surface vessels or from aircraft, and locates the target by means of an acoustic seeker.

Description 

The torpedo uses a CIACIO-S seeker, consisting of an acoustic homing head containing the transducer assembly, transmitter and related Beamforming circuits, and a frame housing all the remaining electronic components. The homing head is capable of active, passive or mixed modes for closing onto its target. It can also discriminate between decoys and real targets in the presence of heavy reverberations by specially emitted pulses and signal processing.

The latest version is the A244-S mod.3 torpedo.

The A244/s are developed and manufactured by the Italian WASS (Whitehead Alenia Sistemi Subacquei) firm.

Operators

Current operators
  - 25 ordered in 2011 
  - 540 
 
  - 50 (ET52 torpedo) 
  - 781
  - 72
  - 450 (NST58 torpedo, another derivative)
  - 88
  - 12
  - 12
  - 75
  - 18
  - 12
  - 72
  - 6 (for familiarization before delivery of MU-90)
  - 250 Mod.1; 100 Mod.3
  - 80
  - 120
  - 50
  - ordered in 2010 for Project-58250 frigates
  - 50 Mod.1 ordered April 1997 for 29.5 million dollars; 24 + 25 ordered in 2005 for 12 million Euros
  - 150

Future operators
 
 Bulgarian Navy: In october 2022 bulgarian government decided for the purchase of A244-S for the two future patrol ships of bulgarian navy. Bulgarian Navy will received 24 A244-S mod.3 torpedoes and supporting equipment for the price of 39.3 mln euro. The torpedoes also will be used from bulgarian navy  Eurocopter AS565 Panther helicopters. The first ship is under construction and will be commissioned in 2025.

See also
 APR-3E torpedo - Russian equivalent
 Mark 54 Lightweight Torpedo - US Navy's equivalent
 MU90 Impact - French/Italian equivalent
 Sting Ray (torpedo) - British equivalent
 TAL Shyena - Indian equivalent
 Yu-7 torpedo - Chinese equivalent
 K745 Chung Sang Eo - South Korean equivalent
 Type 97 light weight torpedo (G-RX4) - Japanese equivalent

Bibliography

Footnotes

References

External links
Jane's Air-Launched Weapons: A.244/S lightweight torpedo
A244/S Mod. 3, Eurotorp
A244 Datasheet
Deagel.com, specifications
History & specifications, at Jane's website, retrieved 2009-03-08

Torpedoes
Aerial torpedoes
Naval weapons of Italy
Anti-submarine weapons
Military equipment introduced in the 1980s